This Is Your Time is the fourth studio album by the Italian/U.S. ensemble Change. It was released in 1983 and reached number one hundred and sixty-one on the US Billboard Album Chart, and thirty-four on the US Billboard Black Albums chart. This Is Your Time includes the singles "This Is Your Time", "Magical Night", "Don't Wait Another Night" and "Got to Get Up".

The band recorded the songs for album at Umbi Studios, Modena, Italy. The sessions were then taken to Sorcerer Sound Studios, New York City for overdubbing and mixing. Receiving mixed reviews the album was originally released as an LP in March 1983. The artwork was designed by Greg Porto.

Track listing

Personnel
 Jacques Fred Petrus - producer, executive producer
 Mauro Malavasi - producer, arranger, conductor
 Timmy Allen - production assistant
 Deborah Cooper - lead vocals
 James "Crab" Robinson - lead vocals
 Timmy Allen - lead vocals, bass guitar
 Rick Brennan - lead vocals, percussion
 Vincent Henry - guitar, saxophone
 Mike Campbell - lead guitar
 Jeff Bova - keyboards
 Mauro Malavasi - keyboards
 Rudy Trevisi - saxophone
 Bernard Davis - drums
 Toby Johnson - drums
 Bobby Douglas, Eric McClinton, Jocelyn Smith, Larry La Falce, Lisa Fischer, Steve Daniels - backing vocals

Recorded at Umbi Studios in Modena, Italy. Overdubbed and mixed at Sorcerer Sound, New York City. Mastered at Sterling Sound.

 Maggi Maurizio - engineering
 Alex Head - overdubs and mixing
 José Rodriguez - mastering

Charts

References

1983 albums
Change (band) albums
Atlantic Records albums